Melazzo is a comune (municipality) in the Province of Alessandria in the Italian region Piedmont, located about  southeast of Turin and about  southwest of Alessandria.

Melazzo borders the following municipalities: Acqui Terme, Bistagno, Cartosio, Castelletto d'Erro, Cavatore, and Terzo.

Notable Melazzesi
 Saint Guido of Acqui (c.1004–1070), born in Melazzo to the family of the Counts of Acquesana, became Bishop of Asti.

Demographic evolution

References

Melazzo